

Erich-Otto Schmidt (17 August 1899 – 18 June 1959) was a general in the Wehrmacht of Nazi Germany during World War II who commanded the 352. Volksgrenadier Division. He was a recipient of the Knight's Cross of the Iron Cross.

Awards and decorations

 Knight's Cross of the Iron Cross on 4 August 1943 as Oberstleutnant and commander of Grenadier-Regiment 679

References

Citations

Bibliography

 

1899 births
1959 deaths
Major generals of the German Army (Wehrmacht)
Recipients of the Knight's Cross of the Iron Cross
German prisoners of war in World War II
Reichswehr personnel
People from Annaberg-Buchholz
Military personnel from Saxony